Ferry station may refer to:

 Ferry Avenue station, Camden, New Jersey
 Ferry Street station, Detroit, Michigan
 Ferry Terminal Station, Osaka, Japan
 Ferry railway station, Cambridgeshire
 South Ferry station (IRT elevated), Manhattan, New York City

See also
 Ferry terminal